Sheikh Hasina National Institute of Youth Development is a Bangladesh government institute that provides training to athletes and carries out research.

History
Sheikh Hasina National Institute of Youth Development was established in 2018 through the passage on an act in Parliament. It was named after Prime Minister Sheikh Hasina.

References

2018 establishments in Bangladesh
Organisations based in Savar
Government agencies of Bangladesh
Research institutes in Bangladesh